This is New is a 2002 album by Dee Dee Bridgewater, dedicated to the songs of Kurt Weill.

Track listing
"This Is New" (Ira Gershwin) – 3:47
"Lost in the Stars" (Maxwell Anderson) – 5:36
"The Bilbao Song" (Michael Feingold, Frank McGuinness) – 10:24
"My Ship" (Ira Gershwin) – 4:56
"Alabama Song" (Bertolt Brecht) – 5:38
"The Saga of Jenny" (Ogden Nash) – 4:54
"Youkali" (Roger Fernay) – 3:54
"I'm a Stranger Here Myself" (Ogden Nash) – 5:50
"Speak Low" (Ogden Nash) – 4:17
"September Song" (Anderson) – 4:40
"Here I'll Stay" (Alan Jay Lerner) – 11:15

All music composed by Kurt Weill, lyricists in brackets.

Personnel
Dee Dee Bridgewater – vocals
Thierry Eliez – Hammond B3 organ, piano, backing vocals, arrangements (tracks: 1, 2)
Louis Winsberg – guitar
Ira Coleman – double bass
André Ceccarelli – drums
Minino Garay – percussion
Nicolas Folmer - trumpet
Denis LeLoup – trombone
Daniele Scannapieco - alto saxophone, flute
Antonio Hart – alto saxophone (2, 10), flute (3)
Juan José Mosalini – bandoneon (7)
Cecil Bridgewater – arranger (except 1, 2), conductor
Bernie Arcadio – string arrangements (4, 9)
China Moses, Tulani Bridgewater Kowalski - backing vocals

Chart positions

References

2002 albums
Dee Dee Bridgewater albums
Kurt Weill tribute albums
Verve Records albums
Albums recorded at Capitol Studios